The 1986–87 Wichita State Shockers men's basketball team represented Wichita State University in the 1986–87 NCAA Division I men's basketball season. They played their home games at the University of Wichita Field House. They were in their 42nd season as a member of the Missouri Valley Conference and 81st season overall. They were led by head coach Eddie Fogler in his 1st season at the school. They finished the season 22–11, 9–5 in Missouri Valley play to finish in third place. They won the MVC tournament to receive an automatic bid to the 1987 NCAA tournament. As the No. 11 seed in the Midwest region, the Shockers lost in the opening round to St. John's, 57–55.

Roster

Schedule and results

|-
!colspan=12 style=""| Regular season

|-
!colspan=12 style=""| MVC Tournament

|-
!colspan=9 style="" | NCAA tournament

References

Wichita State Shockers men's basketball seasons
Wichita State
Wichita State
Shock
Shock